The probabilistic voting theory, also known as the probabilistic voting model, is a voting theory developed by professors Assar Lindbeck and Jörgen Weibull in the article "Balanced-budget redistribution as the outcome of political competition", published in 1987 in the journal Public Choice, which has gradually replaced the median voter theory, thanks to its ability to find equilibrium within multi-dimensional spaces.

The probabilistic voting model assumes that voters are imperfectly informed about candidates and their platforms. Candidates are also imperfectly informed about the utility preferences of the electorate and the distribution of voters' preferences.

Unlike the median voter theorem, what drives the equilibrium policy is both the numerosity and the density of social groups and not the median position of voters on a preference scale. This difference explains why social groups which have a great homogeneity of preferences are more politically powerful than those whose preferences are dispersed.

Motivation and Applications

Political economy and public economics are the main fields where the probabilistic voting theory is applied. In particular, it was used to explain public expenditure (Persson & Tabellini, 2000; Hassler, Krusell, Storesletten & Zilibotti, 2005), public debt dynamics (Song, Storesletten & Zilibotti, 2012), effect of mass media (Strömberg, 2004) social security systems (Profeta, 2002; Gonzalez Eiras & Niepelt, 2008) and taxation (Hettich & Winer, 2005; Canegrati, 2007).

Raphael Boleslavsky and Christopher Cotton (2015) show how the underlying uncertainty that candidates have about the preferences of voters may be the result of information revelation during campaigns, with more informative campaigns leading to greater ex ante uncertainty about election-day preferences. This in turn can increase policy divergence.

Probabilistic voting models are usually preferred to traditional Downsian median voter models, as in the former all voters have an influence on the policy outcome, whereas in the latter all power rests in the hands of the pivotal voter or group. For instance, in models where young and old (or rich and poor) voters have conflicting interests, probabilistic voting models predict that the winning candidate strikes a balance between the different interests in her/his policy platform. Due to the smooth mapping between the distribution of policy preferences and the political outcomes, this model has proven to be very tractable and convenient to use in dynamic models with repeated voting.

References

 Assar Lindbeck, and Jörgen W. Weibull (1987). "Balanced-budget redistribution as the outcome of political competition."
 Public Choice, 52(3), 273–297.
 Raphael Boleslavsky and Christopher Cotton (2015). "Information and extremism in elections." American Economic Journal: Microeconomics. 7, 165-207
 Canegrati, Emanuele (2007). "A Contribution to the Positive Theory of Direct Taxation," MPRA Paper 6117 [1]
 Gonzalez-Eiras, Martín, and Dirk Niepelt (2008). "The Future of Social Security." Journal of Monetary Economics 55, 197-218
 Hassler, John, Per Krusell, Kjetil Storesletten, and Fabrizio Zilibotti (2005). "The dynamics of government." Journal of Monetary Economics 52 (7), 1331-1358
 Hettich, Walter, and Stanley Winer (2005)  Democratic Choice and Taxation A Theoretical and Empirical Analysis. Cambridge University Press.
 Persson, Torsten, and Guido Tabellini (2000). Political Economics: Explaining Economic Policy. Cambridge, Mass.: MIT Press.
 Profeta, Paola (2002). "Retirement and Social Security in a Probabilistic Voting Model" International Tax and Public Finance 9, 331–348.
 Strömberg, David "Mass Media Competition, Political Competition, and Public Policy (2004)." Review of Economic Studies 71(1), 265–284.
 Song, Zheng, Kjetil Storeseletten, and Fabrizio Zilibotti (2012). "Rotten parents and disciplined children: A politico-economic theory of public expenditure and debt". Econometrica 80 (6), 2785–2803

Probabilistic models
Voting theory